Babacar Seck Sakho (born 12 June 1998) is a Spanish karateka. He won the gold medal in the men's kumite +84 kg event at the 2022 World Games held in Birmingham, United States.

Career 

He won one of the bronze medals in the men's kumite +84 kg event at the 2018 World Karate Championships held in Madrid, Spain.

At the 2018 European Karate Championships held in Novi Sad, Serbia, he finished in 5th place in the men's kumite +84 kg event. In 2021, he lost his bronze medal match in the men's +84 kg event at the World Karate Championships held in Dubai, United Arab Emirates.

He competed in the men's +84 kg event at the 2022 Mediterranean Games held in Oran, Algeria where he was eliminated in his first match. He won the gold medal in the men's +84 kg event at the 2022 World Games held in Birmingham, United States.

Personal life 

Born in Senegal, he emigrated to Spain at the age of 11 and settled in Zaragoza.

Achievements

References 

Living people
1998 births
Place of birth missing (living people)
Spanish male karateka
Mediterranean Games competitors for Spain
Competitors at the 2018 Mediterranean Games
Competitors at the 2022 Mediterranean Games
Competitors at the 2022 World Games
World Games medalists in karate
World Games gold medalists
21st-century Spanish people
21st-century Senegalese people
Senegalese emigrants to Spain
Sportspeople from Zaragoza